Erikas Venskus (born 28 May 2000) is a Lithuanian professional basketball player for ZZ Leiden of the BNXT League.

Early life 
Venskus started playing basketball with BC Biržai at age 14.

Professional career
His professional career started by signing with hometown Biržai club in RKL. In 2017, he signed with Žalgiris where he primarily played for the club's under-18 team. On 28 December 2018, Venskus made his EuroLeague debut when he played 2.5 minutes in an away loss in Gran Canaria.

On 4 September 2021, Venskus signed with BC Prienai.

On 8 August 2022, Venskus signed a one-year contract with ZZ Leiden of the BNXT League. On 12 March 2023, he won the Dutch Basketball Cup with Leiden after defeating Landstede Hammers in the final.

National team career 
Venskus played for the Lithuania under-19 team at the 2019 FIBA U18 European Championship where he averaged 12.9 points and 7.3 rebounds.

References

2000 births
Living people
BC Prienai players
BC Žalgiris players
BC Žalgiris-2 players
Lithuanian men's basketball players
People from Biržai
ZZ Leiden players